Olbrachcice  is a village in the administrative district of Gmina Dąbrowa Zielona, within Częstochowa County, Silesian Voivodeship, in southern Poland.

The village has a population of 457.

References

Olbrachcice